My Sister, the Pig Lady (lit. "A Pig Like Woman") is a 2015 South Korean romantic comedy film directed by Jang Moon-il. It was invited to the 39th Montreal World Film Festival as part of their World Greats selection. The film also won Grand Prize at the Osaka Asian Film Festival.

Plot
In a small seaside village, where all the young men have left for the city, three young women, Jae-hwa, Yoo-ja, and Mi-ja hope to catch the eye of Joon-seob, the only eligible bachelor left in town. Jae-hwa has plans to make her family prosperous by raising pigs, but the endeavor is more difficult than she imagined: the pigs keep wandering away. They roam the town and every now and then get stuck in a rut. A rumor spreads that Jae-hwa's mother is having an affair. Not that it matters to her father, who is generally drunk, or to her younger brother, who keeps getting into fights. Joon-seob, who has stood by Jae-hwa despite her family's stream of misfortunes finally take his relationship with Jae-hwa to another level, and they begin dating. But Yoo-ja and Mi-ja aren't about to give up. They begin to scheme...

Cast
Hwang Jung-eum as Jae-hwa
Lee Jong-hyuk as Joon-seob
Choi Yeo-jin as Yoo-ja
Park Jin-ju as Mi-ja

References

External links
 

My Sister, the Pig Lady at the Montreal World Film Festival

2015 films
2010s Korean-language films
South Korean romantic comedy films
2015 romantic comedy films
2010s South Korean films